A term which describes the execution of a non-deterministic program where all choices are made in favour of non-termination.

References

Theoretical computer science